The 2007–08 Hong Kong Second Division League season was started on 8 September 2007.

League table

Results

References and notes

See also
The Hong Kong Football Association
Hong Kong First Division League
Hong Kong Third Division League

Hong Kong Second Division League seasons
Hong
2